Chicken is a type of domesticated bird.

Chicken, chickens, or the chicken may also refer to:
 Chicken (food)

Film and television
 Chicken (2001 film), a 2001 Irish short film
 Chicken (2015 film), a British drama film directed by Joe Stephenson
 Chickens (1916 film), a film starring Oliver Hardy
 Chickens (1921 film), an American silent comedy drama film
 The Chicken (film), a 1965 short comedy film directed by Claude Berri
 Chickens (TV series), a UK TV series starring Simon Bird and Joe Thomas
 Chicken (Family Guy), a recurring character in the American TV series Family Guy
 One of the titular characters in the TV series Cow and Chicken

Music
 Chicken (EP), Los Angeles rock band Ednaswap's only EP

Songs
 "Chicken" (The Eighties Matchbox B-Line Disaster song), 2003
 "The Chicken" (music), a jazz tune composed by Pee Wee Ellis and made famous by Jaco Pastorius
 "The Chicken Song", a parody song from Spitting Image, 1986
 "Chicken", by Sly and the Family Stone from Life, 1968
 "Chicken", by The Cheers, written by Jerry Leiber, Mike Stoller, and Jack Rollins, 1955
 "Chicken", by Kero Kero Bonito, 2015
 "The Chicken", a song by Bo Burnham from The Inside Outtakes, 2022
 "Chickens", by Future and EST Gee from I Never Liked You , 2022
 "Chicken Song", from the 2014 film Bajrangi Bhaijaan

People
 A coward
Chicken (gay slang), a young or young appearing gay male
 Gary "Chicken" Hirsh (born 1940), drummer for the rock group Country Joe and the Fish
 Wilfred "Chicken" Smallhorn (1911–1988), Australian rules footballer

Other uses
 The Chicken (dance), a popular American rhythm and blues dance
 Chicken (game), a typical game studied in game theory
 Chicken, Alaska, a city in the United States
 Chicken Creek (disambiguation), multiple watercourses
 Chicken Rock, an island administered by the Isle of Man
 Dixie Chicken (bar), a popular bar in College Station, Texas, also called The Chicken
 The San Diego Chicken, a San Diego-based sports mascot, also called The Chicken
 Chicken (Scheme implementation), a compiler and interpreter for the programming language Scheme
 Chicken (video game), a 1982 computer game for the Atari 8-bit series
 Grouse, a group of game birds popularly called chicken in some areas

See also